BK Loren is an American novelist and memoirist. Her most recent novel, Theft, was published in June 2012.

Life
She attended The University of Iowa Writers’ Workshop.

Her work appeared in Orion, Women on the Verge, Yoga International, The Art of the Essay, Dutiful Daughters, Parabola, Spirituality and Health, Curve, Berkeley Fiction Review and others.

Loren teaches at the Iowa Summer Festival. and across the U.S. and Canada for conferences, universities and workshops.

Awards
 Mary Roberts Rinehart National Nonfiction Fellowship
 2002 Dana Award for the Novel
 D.H. Lawrence Fiction Award
 Colorado Council for the Arts Fellowship.
 New Millennium Writings Award for Fiction

Works
 
 
 
 Theft. Counterpoint Press. 2012. .

Anthologies
 
 
 
 
 
 Phillip Zaleski, ed. [2012]. The Best American Spiritual Writing 2012. Penguin Books. 
 Marc Bekoff and Cara Blessley Lowe, ed. [2008]. Listening to Cougar. University Press of Colorado. .
 Sheryl St Germain and Margaret Whitford, ed. [2011]. Between Song and Story: Essays for the Twenty-first Century. Autumn House Press. .
 Susan Fox Rogers, ed. [1999]. Women on the Verge. Stonewall Inn Editions. .

Memoir

References

External links
 All works

Year of birth missing (living people)
Living people
21st-century American novelists
American women novelists
Iowa Writers' Workshop alumni
American lesbian writers
American LGBT novelists
21st-century American women writers
21st-century American LGBT people